The 1971 NBA All-Star Game was played at the San Diego Sports Arena, in San Diego, on January 12, 1971.

The coach for the East team was Red Holzman and the West team was coached by Larry Costello. Officials for the game were Mendy Rudolph and Ed T. Rush. The announced attendance was 14,378. West beat the East 108–107. Lenny Wilkens was named the game's Most valuable player.

Team rosters

Western Conference

Eastern Conference

References 

National Basketball Association All-Star Game
All-Star
Basketball competitions in California
Basketball in San Diego
1970s in San Diego
1971 in sports in California